The Velódromo Luis Carlos Galán is a velodrome in Bogotá, Colombia, it was built in 1995 and hosted the 1995 UCI Track Cycling World Championships.

References
Luis Carlos Galán at FixedGearFever

Sports venues in Bogotá
Velodromes in Colombia